Alfred "Butch" Lee Jr. (born December 5, 1956) is a Puerto Rican retired professional basketball player. Lee was the first Puerto Rican and first Latin American-born athlete to play in the National Basketball Association (NBA), accomplishing this after being selected in the first round of the 1978 NBA draft.

He began his career in the NCAA, where he gathered several "Player of the Year" recognitions and earned All-American honors as both a junior and senior while at Marquette University. Lee was selected as the Most Outstanding Player at the 1977 Final Four where he led the Warriors to the school's first national championship. The university recognized this by retiring his jersey.

In the NBA, he played for the Atlanta Hawks, Cleveland Cavaliers and the Los Angeles Lakers. Lee concluded his career in the Baloncesto Superior Nacional (BSN). He is known to be the only Puerto Rican professional basketball player to win championships in the NCAA, NBA, and BSN. Lee was also a member of the Puerto Rican national team.

Playing career

Early life and college
Lee was born in Santurce, San Juan, Puerto Rico to Gloria and Alfred Lee Sr. Lee's family moved to Harlem, New York, U.S., when he was a young child. There he went on to become a 1st Team, PSAL All City basketball player and honor student at the DeWitt Clinton High School in the Bronx.
Lee showed talent for basketball since an early age, and he impressed many college scouts with his game style. He accepted an offer to play for Marquette University, starring there from 1974 to 1978.  In 1974 Lee asked his coach Al McGuire to allow him to play for the United States Olympic basketball team.  However, his coach had sent someone else and Lee went to Puerto Rico where he qualified for the Puerto Rican national basketball team.  When Puerto Rico played against the U.S. in the 1976 Summer Olympics, Lee made 15 out of 18 field goals and scored 35 points.  The U.S. still avoided an upset, defeating Puerto Rico by one point, 95-94.

In 1977, Lee led Marquette to the Final Four in what McGuire had announced would be his final season. The Warriors defeated UNC-Charlotte 51-49 in the semifinal round when Lee found Jerome Whitehead with a length of the court pass for a score just before the buzzer. In the final against North Carolina, Lee scored 19 points and led the Warriors to a come-from-behind 67-59 victory to secure the national championship. Lee was named the tournament's most outstanding player.

Lee in the NBA

Lee then went on to become the first Puerto Rican player to play in the National Basketball Association, when he was chosen in the first round of the 1978 NBA draft by the Atlanta Hawks.

During Lee's first season in the NBA (1978-79), he started with the Hawks averaging 7.7 points per game during 49 games. He was traded to the Cleveland Cavaliers, where he enjoyed what were perhaps his best games in the league, scoring 11.5 points per game in the remaining 33 games of the season. He ended up scoring an average of 9.6 points per game in his first season in the NBA. Lee led the league in games played with 82.

After three games with the Cavs in the 1979-1980 season, Lee suffered a knee injury that would require surgery, and proved to be too big of an obstacle for him to overcome as far as his basketball career was concerned. He only scored 1.3 points per game on those three games. Before the season was over, he would be traded once again, to the Los Angeles Lakers, where, he played alongside Magic Johnson and Kareem Abdul-Jabbar, among others, for eleven games, before his injury recurred, forcing him to retire. He did, however, win an NBA championship ring, as the Lakers went on to beat the Philadelphia 76ers in that season's NBA Finals.

Career stats
Lee's NBA stats in 96 games are 779 points with an 8.1 PPG average, 307 assists with a 3.2 APG average, 137 rebounds with a 1.4 RPG average, 87 steals with a 0.9 SPG average, a .450 field goal percentage, and a .761 free-throw percentage.

Coaching career

Lee, who is fluent in Spanish, returned to Puerto Rico after his experience as an NBA basketball player was over. There, he became a well known and respected head coach with multiple BSN teams.

In 1992, Lee led the Capitanes de Arecibo to the BSN Finals, where they lost to the Leones de Ponce in 6 games. He also coached Aguadilla, Ponce and the Gigantes de Carolina.

In January 2009, he was announced as the new coach of the Cangrejeros de Santurce. However, he was dismissed during the playoffs after Santurce lost two games in a row.

He continued to help out with teams and coached some of them at the Guaynabo Basketball Academy (GBA).

See also

Race and ethnicity in the NBA
List of Puerto Ricans

References

External links
 
 

1956 births
Living people
20th-century African-American sportspeople
21st-century African-American sportspeople
African-American basketball players
All-American college men's basketball players
Atlanta Hawks draft picks
Atlanta Hawks players
Atléticos de San Germán players
Baloncesto Superior Nacional players
Basketball players at the 1976 Summer Olympics
Basketball players from New York City
Cleveland Cavaliers players
DeWitt Clinton High School alumni
Leones de Ponce basketball players
Los Angeles Lakers players
Maratonistas de Coamo players
Marquette Golden Eagles men's basketball players
National Basketball Association players from Puerto Rico
Olympic basketball players of Puerto Rico
Point guards
Puerto Rican men's basketball players
Puerto Rico men's national basketball team players
Sportspeople from Manhattan
Sportspeople from San Juan, Puerto Rico